The Fort Bliss Main Post Historic District, at Fort Bliss in El Paso, Texas, is a  historic district which was listed on the National Register of Historic Places in 1998.  The listing included 343 contributing buildings, two contributing structures, and a contributing site on the Fort Bliss military installation.

During the initial construction of Fort Bliss, during 1891–1899, 27 buildings were built that survive and are counted as contributing buildings in the district, of which 16 are notable for their architecture.  These include examples of Queen Anne, Colonial Revival, and Greek Revival architecture.  An example is Building 8, a two-story hospital building.

There is also Mission Revival present on the base.

References

National Register of Historic Places in El Paso County, Texas
Queen Anne architecture in Texas
Colonial Revival architecture in Texas
Mission Revival architecture in Texas
Buildings and structures completed in 1893
Main Post Historic District